Loïc Chauvet (born 30 April 1988 in Fort-de-France, Martinique) is a professional footballer who plays as a goalkeeper for Club Colonial and internationally for Martinique.

He made his debut for Martinique in 2008. He was in the Martinique Gold Cup squads for the 2013 and 2017 tournaments.

References

1988 births
Living people
Martiniquais footballers
French footballers
Martinique international footballers
Association football goalkeepers
Sportspeople from Fort-de-France
Club Franciscain players
2013 CONCACAF Gold Cup players
2017 CONCACAF Gold Cup players
2019 CONCACAF Gold Cup players
2021 CONCACAF Gold Cup players